Ethmia trifida is a moth in the family Depressariidae. It was described by Andras Kun in 2004. It is found in Myanmar, Thailand, the Philippines and on Borneo and Sumatra.

References

Moths described in 2004
trifida